The Kirusillas Formation is a Homerian geologic formation of central Bolivia. The formation comprises black shales, overlies the Llallagua Formation and is overlain by the Pampa and Guayabillas Formations. The Kirusillas Formation is laterally equivalent to the Lipeón Formation. The formation is a potential source rock for shale oil and shale gas.

Fossil content 
The formation has provided the following fossils:

 Ornatosinuitina reyesi
 Slimonia boliviana
 Styliolina sp.
 Lingulata indet.

See also 
 List of fossiliferous stratigraphic units in Bolivia
 Lipeón Formation

References

Bibliography

Further reading 
 C. J. Fischer. 1969. Deux bellerophontacées nouveaux de Bolive. Bulletin de Societé géologique, France 7:605-608
 

Geologic formations of Bolivia
Silurian System of South America
Silurian Bolivia
Homerian
Shale formations
Source rock formations
Silurian southern paleotemperate deposits
Paleontology in Bolivia
Formations
Formations